Jay Vine (born 16 November 1995) is an Australian professional racing cyclist who currently rides for UCI WorldTeam .

Career 
In December 2020, Vine was initially announced to be joining UCI Continental team  for the 2021 season. However, as a result of winning the 2020 Zwift Academy program, he earned a professional contract with Belgian UCI ProTeam .

Vine made his Grand Tour debut in the 2021 Vuelta a España, ultimately placing 73rd. He also featured in several breakaways, the most notable of which were on stages 12 and 14. On stage 12, he was the last remaining rider of a late breakaway attempt and was caught inside the final kilometre. Two stages later, with  left, Vine dropped back to his team car, and as he was collecting something, he drifted into the side of the car and crashed. He suffered moderate road rash but was able to recover and place third on the summit finish to Pico Villuercas. As a result of his performances during the Vuelta,  extended his contract by two years.

On 26 February 2022, Vine won the men's race at the 2022 UCI Cycling Esports World Championships.

In August 2022, Vine rode his second Grand Tour at the Vuelta. After catching and passing Mark Padun, the remaining lone breakaway rider, Vine held off the GC contenders to win the stage, taking his first win as a professional. He finished 15 and 16 seconds ahead of Remco Evenepoel and Enric Mas, respectively. Two days later, on the race's second mountaintop finish, Vine got into the break that contested the stage win. On the final climb of Collau Fancuaya, Vine dropped his breakaway companions to take his second stage win of the race. He also took the lead in the mountain classification in the process.

Personal life 
Vine and his wife Bre, fellow cyclist/ full time manager support, live in Andorra, .

Major results 

2019
 1st  Overall Tour of the Tropics
1st Stage 3
 3rd Overall New Zealand Cycle Classic
 7th Road race, Oceania Road Championships
2020
 1st Stage 1 Australian National Road Series
 2nd Peaks Challenge Falls Creek
 5th Overall Herald Sun Tour
2021
 2nd Overall Tour of Turkey
2022
 1st  UCI Esports World Championships
 Vuelta a España
1st Stages 6 & 8
Held  after Stages 8–17
 1st  Mountains classification, Étoile de Bessèges
 2nd Overall Tour of Turkey
 2nd Overall Tour of Norway 
2023
 1st  Time trial, National Road Championships
 1st  Overall Tour Down Under

Grand Tour general classification results timeline

References

External links 
 

1995 births
Living people
Australian male cyclists
Sportspeople from Townsville
Cyclists from Queensland
Australian Vuelta a España stage winners
20th-century Australian people
21st-century Australian people